Potassium voltage-gated channel subfamily H member 4 is a protein that in humans is encoded by the KCNH4 gene. The protein encoded by this gene is a voltage-gated potassium channel subunit.

References

Further reading

External links 
 
 

Ion channels
PAS-domain-containing proteins